Bacalar is the municipal seat and largest city in Bacalar Municipality (until 2011 a part of Othón P. Blanco Municipality) in the Mexican state of Quintana Roo, about   north of Chetumal, at 18° 40' 37" N, 88° 23' 43" W. In the 2010 census the city had a population of 11,084 people. At that time it was still a part of Othón P. Blanco, and was its second-largest city (locality), after Chetumal.

Bacalar is also the name of the lagoon, Bacalar lagoon on the east side of the town.

Bacalar was a city of the Maya civilization in Pre-Columbian times.  This was the first city in the region which the Spanish Conquistadores succeeded in taking and holding in 1543 (during the 1543–1544 Pachecos entrada). In 1545 Gaspar Pacheco established the Spanish town here with the name Salamanca de Bacalar with the help of Juan de la Cámara. The region of the southern half of what is now Quintana Roo was governed from Bacalar, answerable to the Captain General of Yucatán in Mérida.

After the town was sacked by pirates in the 17th century, the Fortress de San Felipe Bacalar was completed in 1729, and may still be visited today.

In 1848 Bacalar had a population of about 5,000 people. In 1848 during the Caste War of Yucatán rebellious Chan Santa Cruz Maya conquered the town. It was not retaken by the Mexicans until 1902.

Bacalar was named a "Pueblo Mágico" in 2006.

Between 2005 and 2010 so-called Russian Mennonites who speak German established a colony in Salamanca which had 967 inhabitants in 2010 and 1.175 in 2020. All inhabitants were Protestants and only one of those aged 15 and over was illiterate.

Notes

References

External links

Municipio de Bacalar Official website of Bacalar Municipality
Bacalar Mosaico
Ayuntamiento de Othón P. Blanco Official website of Othón P. Blanco Municipality

Populated places in Quintana Roo
Pueblos Mágicos